The 1989 San Diego Padres season was the 21st season in franchise history.

Offseason
 October 24, 1988: Lance McCullers, Jimmy Jones, and Stan Jefferson were traded by the Padres to the New York Yankees for Jack Clark and Pat Clements.
 December 8, 1988: Bruce Hurst was signed as a free agent by the Padres.
 March 30, 1989: Billy Taylor was signed as a free agent by the Padres.

Regular season

Opening Day starters

Season standings

Record vs. opponents

Notable transactions
 April 24, 1989: Randy Byers was traded by the Padres to the St. Louis Cardinals for Jeremy Hernandez.
 June 2, 1989: John Kruk and Randy Ready were traded by the Padres to the Philadelphia Phillies for Chris James.
 June 5, 1989: Darrell Sherman was drafted by the Padres in the 6th round of the 1989 Major League Baseball draft.
 June 29, 1989: Greg Booker was traded by the Padres to the Minnesota Twins for Freddie Toliver.
 July 22, 1989: Walt Terrell and a player to be named later were traded by the Padres to the New York Yankees for Mike Pagliarulo and Don Schulze. The Padres completed the deal by sending Freddie Toliver to the Yankees on September 27.
 August 30, 1989: Calvin Schiraldi, Darrin Jackson and a player to be named later were traded by the Cubs to the San Diego Padres for Marvell Wynne and Luis Salazar. The Cubs completed the deal by sending Phil Stephenson to the Padres on September 5.

Roster

Player stats

Batting

Starters by position
Note: Pos = Position; G = Games played; AB = At bats; H = Hits; Avg. = Batting average; HR = Home runs; RBI = Runs batted in

Other batters
Note: G = Games played; AB = At bats; H = Hits; Avg. = Batting average; HR = Home runs; RBI = Runs batted in

Pitching

Starting pitchers
Note: G = Games pitched; IP = Innings pitched; W = Wins; L = Losses; ERA = Earned run average; SO = Strikeouts

Other pitchers
Note: G = Games pitched; IP = Innings pitched; W = Wins; L = Losses; ERA = Earned run average; SO = Strikeouts

Relief pitchers
Note: G = Games pitched; IP = Innings pitched; W = Wins; L = Losses; SV = Saves; ERA = Earned run average; SO = Strikeouts

Award winners
 Mark Davis, Cy Young Award Winner 
 Jack Clark, National League Leader Walks (132)
 Tony Gwynn, National League Batting Champion (.336)
 Tony Gwynn, National League Leader Hits (203)
 Bruce Hurst, National League Leader Complete Games (10)

1989 Major League Baseball All-Star Game

Farm system

LEAGUE CHAMPIONS: Spokane

References

External links
 1989 San Diego Padres at Baseball Reference
 1989 San Diego Padres at Baseball Almanac

San Diego Padres seasons
San Diego Padres season
San Diego Padres